Brunstad may refer to:

 Brunstad Christian Church
 Brunstad Conference Center

People with the surname
Endre Brunstad (born 1967), Norwegian linguist